The Witset First Nation is a First Nations band government of the Wet'suwet'en people of Witset, British Columbia, Canada.  Their mailing address is in Smithers but their main community is at Witset.

Indian reserves
Indian reserves governed by the band are:
Babine Indian Reserve No. 17, between Moricetown IR No. 1 and Coryatsqua IR No. 2, south of the Moricetown CNR station, 64.80 ha.
Babine Indian Reserve No. 18, on Corya Creek, one mile west of the Moricetown CNR station, 259 ha.
Bulkley River Indian Reserve No. 19, on the left bank of the Bulkley River north of and adjoining Moricetown IR No. 1, 242.80 ha.
Coryatsaqua (Moricetown) Indian Reserve No. 2, on the Smithers-Hazelton Road, the Moricetown CNR station is on this reserve, 126.40 ha.
Jean Baptiste Indian Reserve No. 28, about 6 miles southeasterly from the Smithers CNR station, 129.50 ha.
Moricetown Indian Reserve No. 1, on the Bulkley River 28 miles southeasterly from Hazelton, 539.50 ha.
Oschawwinna Indian Reserve No. 3, on the Bulkley River Road, about 3 miles southeasterly from Moricetown IR No. 1, 65.0 ha.

References

External links
 Witset First Nation

Bulkley Valley
Dakelh governments